Jadu is a mountain town in western Libya (Tripolitania), formerly in the Jabal al Gharbi District. Before the 2007 reorganization, and after 2015 it was part of Yafran District.

Geography
Jadu is located in the Nafusa Mountains, twenty-five kilometers southwest of Tarmeisa (طرميسة, Ţarmīşah).

History
Jadu was formerly the capital of the Nafusa Mountains District.

Giado concentration camp
Giado, as it was then known by its Italian name, was the site of an Italian concentration camp during the Second World War. In 1942, about 2,600 Jews  and other people, who were considered undesirables, were rounded up throughout Libya and sent to the Giado camp.
564 died from typhus and other privations. The camp was liberated by the British Army in January 1943.

Civil war

Jadu's council rejected the draft 2017 constitution.

In April 2020, local Amazigh forces were bombed at the end of the Second Libyan Civil War.

See also
 The Holocaust in Italian Libya
 List of cities in Libya

References

External links
 "Jadu, Libya", Falling Rain Genomics, Inc.

Italian concentration camps
Populated places in Jabal al Gharbi District
Libya in World War II
Antisemitism in Italy
Jews and Judaism in Italy
Concentration camps
Concentration camps
Concentration camps
The Holocaust in Italy
Concentration camps
World War II concentration camps
Baladiyat of Libya